Daley Sinkgraven (born 4 July 1995) is a Dutch professional footballer who plays as a left-back for  club Bayer Leverkusen.

Club career

Heerenveen
Sinkgraven started playing football with MVV Alcides from his hometown Meppel. He ended up in the youth academy of SC Heerenveen. Sinkgraven had a breakthrough season in 2013–14 playing 17 games while starting five of them. He made his debut in the 2–2 draw against Roda JC Kerkrade on 18 January 2014 by replacing Hakim Ziyech. On 28 March 2014, he extended his contract until the summer of 2017. On 22 November 2014, he scored an own goal in a 4–1 away loss to Ajax. Sinkgraven's great performances for Heerenveen caught the eye of many giant English clubs. Chelsea, Liverpool and Manchester United were all very interested in buying the teenage Sinkgraven.

Ajax

On 30 January 2015, after excellent performances for SC Heerenveen, it was announced that Sinkgraven had joined Ajax for a fee of €7 million at the tender age of 19 years old, making him the club's most expensive acquisition since Miralem Sulejmani, who had also made the transfer to Ajax from Heerenveen. He signed a five and a half year-contract with the club and was given the number 8 shirt previously worn by Lerin Duarte, who was sent on a six-month loan spell to Heerenveen in return. He made his debut for the first team of Ajax in the starting lineup on 5 February 2015 in a 1–0 home loss to AZ. 

Sinkgraven helped guide Ajax to the final of the 2016–17 Europa League where they lost to Manchester United. Sinkgraven was also a part of the Ajax team that won the Dutch Eredivisie title and the Dutch KNVB Cup during the 2018–19 season. In that same season, Sinkgraven also helped Ajax reach the semi-finals of the Champions League where they lost to Tottenham, after knocking out Real Madrid and Juventus in the previous rounds. Sinkgraven was hampered by injuries for a lot of the time, while at Ajax. In his four and a half years at Ajax, he missed 101 games through injury and he was out injured for a total of 738 days.

Bayer Leverkusen
On 17 June 2019, Sinkgraven signed for Bayer Leverkusen on a four-year contract, to rejoin his former Ajax coach Peter Bosz.

International career
Sinkgraven has been capped at various youth levels, notably representing the Dutch U21, U19 teams. He has received call-ups for the senior national team but has not been capped as of July 2021.

Personal life
Sinkgraven is the son of Dutch football coach Harry Sinkgraven.

Career statistics

Club

Honours

Club
Ajax
 Eredivisie: 2018–19
 KNVB Cup: 2018–19
 UEFA Europa League runner-up: 2016–17

References

External links

 Voetbal International profile 

Netherlands U17 profile  at OnsOranje
Netherlands U18 profile  at OnsOranje
Netherlands U19 profile  at OnsOranje
Netherlands U21 profile  at OnsOranje

1995 births
Living people
Dutch footballers
Netherlands under-21 international footballers
Netherlands youth international footballers
Association football midfielders
SC Heerenveen players
AFC Ajax players
Jong Ajax players
Bayer 04 Leverkusen players
Eredivisie players
Eerste Divisie players
Dutch expatriate footballers
Expatriate footballers in Germany
People from Assen
Bundesliga players
Footballers from Drenthe
Dutch expatriate sportspeople in Germany